The Women's 10 km Walk at the 1992 Summer Olympics was held on August 3, 1992, in Barcelona, Spain. There were a total number of 44 competitors, with six athletes who were disqualified.

Inside the stadium, Alina Ivanova of the Unified Team and Chen Yueling of China were locked in a tight battle. With 200 metres to go, Ivanova accelerated, and began sprinting for what looked like would be a gold/bronze combination for the former Soviet athletes as Chen maintained her pace to stay ahead of Yelena Nikolayeva and Chen's teammate Li Chunxiu.

Ivanova crossed the finish line in first, but her final sprint saw her confronted by  officials and disqualified; in the midst of this, Ileana Salvador of Italy sprinted past Li at the line, and she too was disqualified.

This gave Chen the gold medal and Li the bronze, while Chen also took the inaugural Olympic record.

Medalists

Abbreviations
All times shown are in hours:minutes:seconds

Records

Final ranking

See also
 1987 Women's World Championships 10km Walk (Rome)
 1990 Women's European Championships 10km Walk (Split)
 1991 Women's World Championships 10km Walk (Tokyo)
 1992 Race Walking Year Ranking
 1993 Women's World Championships 10km Walk (Stuttgart)
 1994 Women's European Championships 10km Walk (Helsinki)

References

External links
 Official Report
 Results

W
Racewalking at the Olympics
1992 in women's athletics
Women's events at the 1992 Summer Olympics